The Washington State Cougars men's basketball team represents Washington State University and competes in the Pac-12 Conference (Pac-12) of NCAA Division I. The Cougars play their home games on campus in Pullman at Beasley Coliseum, which has a capacity of 12,058. They are currently led by head coach Kyle Smith (69-61).

History
Washington State began varsity intercollegiate competition in men's basketball in 1902. The Cougars were retroactively awarded the 1917 National Championship by the Helms Athletic Foundation and the Premo-Porretta Power Poll. The team played to large crowds in the late-1970s when George Raveling was head coach.

For the better part of seven decades, the Cougars were a consistent contender in the Pac-10 and its predecessor, the Pacific Coast Conference. After a dark period in the late 1990s and early 2000s, there was the beginning of a resurgence under coach Dick Bennett. The 2004–05 season saw a large increase in student support as the team finished within a few wins of a .500 record (along with a stunning upset win against Arizona, an eventual Elite Eight team). Bennett retired at the end of the 2005–06 season and was replaced by his son, Tony.

Tony Bennett tied the all-time WSU record for wins (26) twice in three seasons as head coach before leaving to coach the Virginia Cavaliers in 2009. Washington State had recently cancelled a trip to the 2009 Final Four for Bennett and his staff, and was considering dropping chartered recruiting trips which had been started one year prior at Bennett's request.

2006–07

The Cougars earned a #3 seed in the NCAA tournament and beat Oral Roberts 70–54 in the first round. The Cougars then lost to Vanderbilt in the second round 78–74 in double overtime. Their final record was 13–5 in the Pac-10 and 26–8 overall, which tied the school record for most wins in a season. During the 2006–07 season, the Cougars swept rival Washington, Arizona, Arizona State, USC, Oregon State, and California. In the tournament, the coaching staff wore a pin saying TAY, which stood for Turn-Around Year. After the season, Coach Tony Bennett received the Naismith Coach of the Year award, the highest honor for a college basketball coach.

2007–08

In 2008, the Cougars returned to the NCAA tournament. The Cougars earned a #4 seed and were matched up against #13 seed Winthrop University. The Cougars dominated in the second half after a 29–29 tie in the first half to finish 71–40, far beyond the 9 point margin they were favored by.

After two straight victories in the NCAA Tournament, the Cougars headed to the Sweet Sixteen for the second time in school history. In the Sweet Sixteen, Washington State was matched against the #1 overall seed North Carolina. During the first half, both teams seem evenly matched, but North Carolina took control in the second half and won by a score of 68–47. The Cougars finished the 2007–08 season with a record of 26–9.

The Kyle Smith Turnaround

On March 27, 2019, Smith was named as the 19th head coach of Washington State, agreeing to a six-year contract worth $1.4 million annually. He was formally introduced at a press conference on April 1, 2019. In his first season at Washington State, Smith led the Cougars to a 6-12 conference record(16-16 overall), their best since 2011-12. In the first round of the Pac-12 Tournament, Washington State beat Colorado, their first win in the conference tournament in over 10 years. In September 2021, Smith signed a contract extension through the 2026-27 season. [1]

During the 2021-22 season, Smith lead the Cougars to their first winning record in conference play (11-9) in 14 years (2007-08). The Cougars followed up their regular season success with a win in the Pac-12 Tournament before losing to eventual runner-up UCLA. Following that, an NIT berth as a No. 4 seed gave the Cougs their first postseason bout in 11 years. Their first round win against Santa Clara (63-50) notched their first 20-win season since 2010-11. The 2021-22 season ended after an impressive run that landed the Cougs in the Semifinals of the NIT (for the second time in program history) against Texas A&M, where their final record on the season was 22-15.

Head coaches

 John B. Evans (1901–03)
 James N. Ashmore (1904–05)
 Everett M. Sweeley (1905–07)
 John R. Bender (1907–08)
 Fred Bohler (1908–26)
 Karl Schlademan (1926–28)
 Jack Friel (1928–58)
 Marv Harshman (1959–71)
 Bob Greenwood (1971–72)
 George Raveling* (1972–83)
 Len Stevens (1983–87)
 Kelvin Sampson (1987–94)
 Kevin Eastman (1994–99)
 Paul Graham (1999–2003)
 Dick Bennett (2003–06)
 Tony Bennett (2006–09)
 Ken Bone (2009–14)
 Ernie Kent (2014–2019)
 Kyle Smith (2019-Present)

George Raveling* was the first African American head coach in the Pacific Athletic Conference (known as the PAC 8 at the time). He coached from 1972–1983 and won 167 games at WSU. 

Head coach Tony Bennett announced that he was leaving for Virginia following the 2008–09 season. Bennett, who became head coach after his father Dick Bennett's retirement, finished the season with a  record. In the previous two years, he led the Cougars to consecutive NCAA tournament appearances; father and son coached the Cougars for three seasons each.

Ken Bone replaced Bennett as head coach of the WSU Cougars Men's Basketball Team in February 2009. Bone served as head coach until 2014 and he was followed as head coach by Ernie Kent.
Kent served as head coach until 2019. He was replaced by current head coach Kyle Smith.

Postseason

NCAA tournament results
The Cougars have appeared in six NCAA Tournaments, with an overall record

NIT results
The Cougars have appeared in seven National Invitation Tournaments (NIT), with a combined record of 10–7.

CBI results
The Cougars have appeared in one College Basketball Invitational (CBI). Their combined record is 4–2.

Retired numbers

The Cougars have retired two jersey numbers in program history, most recently Klay Thompson's number 1 in 2020.

Cougars in the NBA
Washington State has had 20 former players who have gone on to play in the NBA.

Rivalries

Gonzaga
As of the 2013–14 season, Washington State has a  lead in the series against the Bulldogs; the series began in 1907 and has most recently been played annually since 2001. The game in December 2007 marked the first time the two met as ranked teams. Visiting Washington State was ranked #6 in the AP Poll and won  over #19 Gonzaga at the McCarthey Athletic Center.

Idaho

They often met four or five times per season until 1964, reduced to twice a season for the next decade. It has since become an annual event early in the schedule (except for the mid-1990s, when two games per season were played). The continuing rivalry is the oldest in the western United States, four years older than WSU's series with the Washington Huskies.

The two played the first-ever regular season basketball game in the newly-enclosed Kibbie Dome in January 1976, won by the Cougars. The rivalry was at its peak in December 1982 when 11,000 were in the same venue for a Saturday night overtime thriller, won by 

Washington State has a  lead in the series through November 2021, when Washington State won  in Moscow, for a fourth straight win.

Washington

As of 2022, the Washington Huskies have a  lead in the series that began in 1910.

Statistical records

Scoring

Assists

Rebounds

Record vs. Pac-12 opponents
The Washington State Cougars have the following all-time series records vs. Pac-12 opponents.

 Note all-time series includes non-conference matchups.

References

External links